Achachi, (Azerbaijani Turkish: Açaçı); also Romanized as Āchāchī) is a city in the Central District of Mianeh County, East Azerbaijan province, Iran. At the 2006 census, its population was 3,777 in 1,020 households. The following census in 2011 counted 3,683 people in 1,151 households. The latest census in 2016 showed a population of 3,647 people in 1,190 households.

The city is famous for training highly qualified athletes in weightlifting and cycling.

The Achachi people are Azerbaijani and speak Azerbaijani Turkish. Two large rivers of Azerbaijan meet in this city, one is Giziluzen and the other is Miyanachay. In the southern part of the city, the Gaflankuh mountain range and its tunnels, as well as the Maiden's Tower and the Maiden's Bridge, have created a beautiful nature that engages the brain of every spectator. This city is the center of Qaflankuh-e Gharbi village. The Tehran-Tabriz-Europe transit road passes through the center of the city. The presence of numerous supermarkets along the way has turned this city into a market for dried fruits, dairy products and souvenirs in Azerbaijan.

Etymology 
According to Vladimir Minorsky, the name "Achachi" is derived from the Mongolian language and means "carriers of loads (achān)".

References 

Meyaneh County

Cities in East Azerbaijan Province

Populated places in East Azerbaijan Province

Populated places in Meyaneh County